The 2009–10 Scottish Premier League season was the twelfth season of the Scottish Premier League. Rangers were the defending champions and they retained the championship with three games to spare by winning 1–0 against Hibernian at Easter Road on 25 April. The competition began on 15 August 2009 and ended on 9 May 2010.

Clubs

Promotion and relegation from 2008–09
Promoted from First Division to Premier League
 St Johnstone

Relegated from Premier League to First Division
 Inverness Caledonian Thistle

Stadia and locations

Personnel and kits

Managerial changes

Events

 21 April – Inverness Caledonian Thistle won promotion to the Scottish Premier League as First Division champions following a 1–0 defeat for their nearest challengers Dundee against Raith Rovers.
 25 April – Rangers clinch the championship by winning 1–0 against Hibernian at Easter Road.
 5 May – The 6–6 draw between Motherwell and Hibernian at Fir Park breaks the SPL record for the most goals scored in a single SPL match.
8 May – Falkirk were relegated after goalless draw against Kilmarnock at Rugby Park.

League table

Results

Matches 1–22
During their first 22 matches, each team played every other team home and away.

Matches 23–33
During matches 23–33 each team played every other team once (either at home or away).

Matches 34–38
After 33 matches, the table splits into two groups of six.  Each team plays every team in their own half once (either at home or away)

Top six

Bottom six

Attendances
Source: SPL

Goals

Top scorers
Sources: SPL BBC

Hat-tricks

5 player scored 5 goals

Awards

Monthly awards

Clydesdale Bank Premier League Awards

References

External links
2009–10 Scottish Premier League Season at ESPN

Scottish Premier League seasons
1
Scot